The Colgate Raiders football team represents Colgate University in NCAA Division I Football Championship Subdivision (FCS) college football competition as a member of the Patriot League.

History

In 1915, Colgate recorded its 100th victory with a win over Army and also beat Yale on their way to a 5–1 finish. The following season, they compiled an 8–1 record, with the lone loss coming against Yale, 7–3.

During the Great Depression, there was a proliferation of postseason benefit games to raise money for the unemployed. On December 6, 1930, Colgate traveled to New York City's Yankee Stadium to play New York University (NYU) in one of these games and won, 7–0. In 1932, Colgate finished undefeated, untied and unscored upon with a 9–0 record. They outscored their opponents 234–0. Parke H. Davis selected the 1932 Red Raiders to share the national championship. They did not, however, receive an invitation to the 1933 Rose Bowl, and as such, have been referred to as "undefeated, untied, unscored upon, and uninvited." The team was considered as a candidate to play in the first Sugar Bowl in January 1935 but the honor went to Temple University.

In 1982, Colgate football was relegated from the Division I-A to Division I-AA (now FCS) level. Since then, the team has advanced to the playoffs numerous times. In 2003, Colgate advanced to the Division I FCS final, having won 15 straight games that season (12-0 Schedule, 3 Playoff Wins), becoming the first and only Patriot League team to ever do so (achieving a final record of 15-1). There, the Raiders lost to Delaware, 40–0. Two Raiders have received the Walter Payton Award for most outstanding player in Division I-AA: Kenny Gamble in 1987 and Jamaal Branch in 2003.

Classifications
1937–1972: NCAA University Division
1972–1977: NCAA Division I
1978–1981: NCAA Division I–A
1982–present: NCAA Division I–AA/FCS

Conference memberships
1890–1972: Independent
1973–1977: Division I Independent
1978–1981: Division I–A Independent
1982–1985: Division I–AA Independent
1986–present: Patriot League

Achievements

National championships

Conference championships

Division I-AA/FCS Playoffs results
The Raiders have appeared in the I-AA/FCS playoffs 11 times with a record of 7–11.

Notable players
 Frank Abruzzino – American football player
 Patrick Afriyie - Current NFL defensive lineman and linebacker for the Los Angeles Chargers (2019)
Jamaal Branch – Former NFL running back for the New Orleans Saints (2006–2007)
Tom Burgess - Former Canadian Football League quarterback (1986 - 1995) 1990 Grey Cup MVP
 Frank Castleman – Won Silver medal in 200 metre hurdles during the 1904 Summer Olympics
 Nate Eachus – Former NFL fullback for the Kansas City Chiefs (2012)
 Rich Erenberg – Former NFL running back for the Pittsburgh Steelers (1984–1986)
 Arthur Fazzin – Actor and game show host better known as Art Fleming (1942–?, transferred to Cornell)
 Dan Fortmann – Inducted into the Pro Football Hall of Fame in 1965, former NFL Guard/Linebacker for the Chicago Bears (1936–1943), 3× NFL Champion (1940, 1941 and 1943), 6× First Team All-Pro selection and 3× Pro Bowl selection
 Kenny Gamble – Former NFL running back for the Kansas City Chiefs (1988–1990). As of 2013, he is the last Colgate player to be selected during the NFL Draft
 Bill Geyer – Former NFL Halfback for the Chicago Bears (1942–1943, 1946)
 Michael Joseph Hayes – First Lieutenant in the United States Army. He was killed in an attack on Saint-Juvin, France on October 14, 1918 and was posthumously awarded the Distinguished Service Cross.
 Nick Hennessey – Former NFL Offensive tackle for the Buffalo Bills (2009) and played in the Canadian Football League
 Joe Hoague – Former NFL Fullback for the Pittsburgh Steelers (1941–1942) and Boston Yanks (1946) 
 Marv Hubbard – Former NFL Fullback for the Oakland Raiders (1969–1975) and 3× Pro Bowl selection
 Ellery Huntington, Jr. – Inducted into the College Football Hall of Fame in 1972
 Don Irwin – Former NFL Fullback for the Boston/Washington Redskins (1936–1939) and NFL Champion (1937)
 Matt Jaworski – Former NFL Linebacker for the Indianapolis Colts (1991) also played in the Canadian Football League for the Sacramento Goldminers (1994)
 Len Macaluso – Former professional wrestler who competed under the name "Iron Legs" Macaliso
 Greg Manusky – Former NFL linebacker for the Washington Redskins (1988–1990), Minnesota Vikings (1991–1993) and Kansas City Chiefs (1994–1999), current defensive coordinator for the Redskins
 Mike Micka – Former NFL Fullback/Defensive back for the Washington Redskins (1944–1945) and Boston Yanks (1945–1948)
 Mark Murphy – Former NFL Safety for the Washington Redskins (1977–1984), Super Bowl XVII Champion, 1× Pro Bowl selection and is the Green Bay Packers CEO and President since 2007
 John Orsi – Inducted into the College Football Hall of Fame in 1982
 Eugene Robinson – Former NFL Safey for the Seattle Seahawks (1985–1995), Green Bay Packers (1996–1997), Atlanta Falcons (1998–1999) and Carolina Panthers (2000), Super Bowl XXXI Champion, 2× All-Pro selection and 3× Pro Bowl selection
 Ed Stacco – Former NFL Offensive tackle for the Detroit Lions (1947) and Washington Redskins (1948)
 Mark van Eeghen – Former NFL Running back for the Oakland Raiders (1974–1981) and New England Patriots (1982–1983)
 Ryan Vena – Former Arena Football League Quarterback.
 Ed Tryon – Inducted into the College Football Hall of Fame in 1963
 Belf West – offensive tackle for the Canton Bulldogs
 Izzy Yablok – American football player

Future non-conference opponents
Announced schedules as of November 22, 2019.

References

External links

 

 
American football teams established in 1890
1890 establishments in New York (state)